Irma Brenman Pick (born 1934) is a South African-born British psychologist and psychoanalyst known for her work on countertransference. She served as the president of the British Psychoanalytical Society from 1997 to 2000.

Early life 
Brenman Pick was born and raised in South Africa and initially planned to pursue further training to become a nursery teacher. But she chose to continue her education to the university level when she was encouraged to so by the woman who interviewed her prior to entering the nursery teaching training program. Later, Brenman Pick attended the University of the Witwatersrand in Johannesburg and academically excelled in her chosen major, social science.

Career 
Brenman Pick joined the Tavistock Clinic to train as a child psychotherapist when she moved to London with her first husband in 1955. She continued her education and practice there until 1960 when she started adult psychotherapy training as well as additional instruction in child psychotherapy at the Institute of Psychoanalysis. Throughout her years of practice, she is influenced by the work of Melanie Klein, Wilfred Bion, and Herbert Rosenfeld. She served as the president of the British Psychoanalytical Society from 1997 to 2000 and was also occupied the position of the Chair of the Student Progress and Education Committees and of the International Psychoanalytical Association’s Committee on Psychoanalytic Education.

Personal life 
When Brenman Pick was 20 years old, she married Abe Pick, a doctor, in South Africa. They had a son, Daniel Pick, born in 1960. In 1961, Abe Pick died at the age of 35. In 1975, Pick re-married, this time with a fellow psychoanalyst, Eric Brenman, who died in 2012.

Selected works 

 Pick, I. B. (1985). Male sexuality: A clinical study of forces that impede development. International Journal of Psychoanalysis. 66:415-422.
 Pick, I. B. (1985). Working through in the countertransference. International Journal of Psychoanalysis. 66:157-166.
 Pick, I. B. (1988). Adolescence: its impact on patient and analyst. International Review of Psychoanalysis. 15:187-194.
 Pick, I. B. (2018). Authenticity in the Psychoanalytic Encounter: The Work of Irma Brenman Pick. London: Routledge.

References

External links 

 Irma Brenman at the 25th Annual Melanie Klein Public Lecture

1934 births
Living people
British psychoanalysts
20th-century British women scientists
21st-century British women scientists
University of the Witwatersrand alumni
South African emigrants to the United Kingdom
British women psychologists